The Order of Brilliant Jade is a civilian order of the Republic of China that can be worn only by the head of a nation. According to regulations, the order can only be presented by the president of the country or an emissary expressly dispatched to friendly nations for the conferment. The order was instituted in 1933. It has a star-patterned face of inlaid jade bordered with gold and pearls. In the centre there is white sun surrounded by blue sky, the national emblem. Previously, the Order of the Brilliant Jade was divided into two, namely Grand Order of Brilliant Jade (current) and Order of Brilliant Jade with nine ranks.

Controversy and suggestions to rename
The Chinese official name of the order 采玉大勳章 (cǎi yù dà xūnzhāng) was claimed to be named after President Chiang Kai-shek's mother, Wang Caiyu (Wáng Cǎiyù) by Democratic Progressive Party members of Legislative Yuan, and there are suggestions from the pan-green coalition to rename the order to suit Taiwanese locality as "Order of Taiwan", but this was not passed at the Legislative Yuan in April 2007, facing opposition from the Kuomintang.

Recipients 

 Minnie Vautrin
 Edvard Beneš (1936)
 Mario Abdo Benítez
 Bhumibol Adulyadej
 Chiang Kai-shek
 Álvaro Colom
 Faisal of Saudi Arabia (Grand Cordon, 1971)
 Juan Orlando Hernández
 Leopold III of Belgium
 Fernando Lugo
 Ricardo Maduro
 Frederick Maze
 Jovenel Moïse
 Bingu wa Mutharika
 Mohammad Reza Pahlavi
 Thomas Remengesau Jr.
 Antonio Saca
 Anote Tong
 Donald Van Slyke
 Baron Waqa
 Pakubuwana X (1933)

See also 
 Order of the Double Dragon: Imperial Chinese award for foreign recipients
 Order of the Precious Brilliant Golden Grain: Earlier ROC award

References

Orders, decorations, and medals of the Republic of China
Awards established in 1933
Foreign relations of Taiwan
Orders of chivalry awarded to heads of state, consorts and sovereign family members